The siege of Alexandria (17 August – 2 September 1801) was fought during the French Revolutionary Wars between French and British forces. It was the last action of the French campaign in Egypt and Syria (1798–1801). The French had occupied Alexandria, a major fortified harbour city on the Nile Delta in northern Egypt, since 2 July 1798, and the garrison there surrendered on 2 September 1801.

Background

The battle between the British and French at Canope on 21 March 1801 resulted in a French repulse. The French under Menou, disheartened by this failure, retired to Alexandria. With Abercrombie's death, John Hely-Hutchinson succeeded as commander of the British force in August. He now intended to lay siege to Alexandria and bottle Menou up.

Hutchinson left Coote with 6,000 men and then sent part of the reserve with Baron Charles de Hompesch to capture Rosetta. He then advanced to Cairo, which he reached, after a few skirmishes, in mid June. Joined by a sizable Turkish force Hutchinson invested Cairo and on 27 June the 13,000-strong French garrison under General Augustin Daniel Belliard, out-manned and out-gunned, surrendered. General John Moore then escorted them to the coast via Rosetta.

Siege
Hutchinson, with Cairo out of the way, now began the final reduction of Alexandria. He had thirty five battalions in total. While the reserve feinted to the east, Coote, with the Guards and two other brigades, landed on 16 August to its west where fierce opposition was encountered by the garrison of Fort Marabout, which the 54th Regiment of Foot eventually stormed. Both sides mounted combined assaults but the French soldiers, unable to break out and with food shortages and disease taking their toll, became increasingly disillusioned with the campaign. Menou knew he had no hope and on 26 August asked for terms; on 26 August he proposed formal terms of capitulation. The terms as amended by British commanders and put into effect are known as the Capitulation of Alexandria.

Aftermath
By 2 September total of 10,000 French surrendered under terms which allowed them to keep their personal weapons and baggage, and to return to France on British ships. However, all French ships and cannons at Alexandria were surrendered to the British.

Of the warships captured in the harbour, the French frigates Égyptienne (50) and Régénérée (40), and the ex-Venetian frigate Léoben (26) went to Britain, while the French frigate Justice (44), the ex-Venetian ship of the line Causse (64) and frigate Mantoue (26), and the ex-Turkish corvettes Halil Bey, Momgo Balerie and Salâbetnümâ went to the Turks, under Capitan Pacha (sic).

Historians relate that the French garrison, feeling abandoned by an uncaring Republic, gradually abandoned the high standards of conduct and service characteristic of the French Revolutionary Army. Many soldiers refused to renew their oath to the Republic, or did so half-heartedly. In his memoirs, the surgeon-in-chief of Napoleon's Grand Army, Baron Dominique-Jean Larrey, remembers how the consumption of the meat of young Arab horses helped the French to curb an epidemic of scurvy. He would so start the 19th-century tradition of horse meat consumption in France.

The Rosetta Stone
After the surrender, a dispute arose over the fate of French archaeological and scientific discoveries in Egypt. One of the key artifacts was the Rosetta Stone which had been discovered in mid-July 1799 by French scientists of the Institut d'Égypte. Menou refused to hand them over, claiming they belonged to the institute. How exactly the stone came into British hands is disputed. Colonel Tomkyns Hilgrove Turner, who escorted the stone to Britain, claimed later that he had personally seized it from Menou and carried it away on a gun carriage. Turner brought the stone to Britain aboard Egyptienne, landing in February 1802. On 11 March it was presented to the Society of Antiquaries of London. Later it was taken to the British Museum, where it remains to this day. Inscriptions painted in white on the artifact state "Captured in Egypt by the British Army in 1801" on the left side and "Presented by King George III" on the right.

Order of battle

See also
 French Campaign in Egypt and Syria

Notes

References

 Barthorp, Michael. Napoleon's Egyptian Campaigns 1798-1801, Osprey Publishing, 1992.
 Downs, Jonathan. Discovery at Rosetta. Skyhorse Publishing, 2008 
 Lynne, John A. "Toward an Army of Honor: The Moral Evolution of the French Army, 1789-1815." French Historical Studies, Vol. 16, No. 1. (Spring, 1989)
 
 Smith, D. The Greenhill Napoleonic Wars Data Book. Greenhill Books, 1998.
 Wilson, Robert Thomas. History of the British expedition to Egypt. 4th ed. London: Military Library, 1803 Text at Google Books

External links
 

Alex
French campaign in Egypt and Syria
Alexandria
Alexandria
Alexandria
Conflicts in 1801
Siege of Alexandria
1801 in Egypt
Alexandria
19th-century military history of the United Kingdom
August 1801 events
September 1801 events
19th century in Alexandria